The Military ranks of Zaire were the military insignia used by the Zairian Armed Forces. The ranks are based on the Belgian military ranks, with additional influence from France and the United States. Following the overthrow of Mobutu Sese Seko, the ranks were replaced by the military ranks of the Democratic Republic of the Congo.

Commissioned officer ranks
The rank insignia of commissioned officers.

Other ranks
The rank insignia of non-commissioned officers and enlisted personnel.

References

External links
 

Zaire
Military of the Democratic Republic of the Congo
Zaire